Roy "The Boy" Brindley (born June 10, 1969 in Southampton) is an English professional poker player, now living in Wicklow, Ireland.

Early years
Before his poker career, Brindley was involved in greyhound racing, and worked in a kennels near Dorking at the age of 17, then moving to other kennels in Lincolnshire and Essex before moving to Andover, where he was a professional greyhound trainer from 1991 to 1995.

Brindley moved to America in 1995 to continue training greyhounds, but moved back soon after.  Following some personal crises Brindley ended up living on the street.

Following spells as a TV presenter for regional TV (Town TV, Andover), freelance journalist and as a magazine editor (Greyhound Monthly Magazine), he took up poker playing on arrival in Ireland in 2001.

Poker career
After seeing a documentary on Noel Furlong winning the 1999 World Series of Poker (WSOP), Brindley took up poker in early 2001.

In 2002, Brindley won seven ranking tournaments, and finished second to Kirill Gerasimov in the World Heads-Up Poker Championship (WHUPC). At the time of the WHUPC, Brindley had so little cash that he couldn't afford a taxi home and had to walk back to his hotel every night of the tournament. Yet, after finishing second, Brindley was distraught and came close to throwing his €40,000 winnings out of the hotel window.

Brindley also finished third in the 2005 William Hill Poker Grand Prix, second in the Masterclassics of Poker Omaha event in 2006, second in the Paris Open of Poker in 2007 and won the televised Betfair Poker Masters of Europe in 2007.  As for titles no Player has won more European ranking tournaments than him despite his relatively short career.

In addition to his playing career, Brindley regularly commentated on SKY Sports' Poker Million and acted as an industry spokesman. He is a regular columnist for Card Player Magazine and works as a poker journalist for various newspapers.

His autobiography, Life's a Gamble, was published on February 26, 2009 by Transworld.

As of 2008, his total live tournament winnings exceed $800,000.

From the Spring of 2012 Brindley has acted as the resident F1 betting expert on At The Races. In July 2013 he appeared on Calvin Ayre TV where he announced he was in legal litigation with his sponsors of nine years, Ladbrokes, for their cessation of affiliate payments and breach of contract.

In the mid-late 2010's Brindley wrote for BetVictor's blog and Gambling.com. He has made the odd foray back into poker. In 2017 he beat 1,238 rivals to land the LS30 Series in Dublin. He also represented Ireland at the Match Poker European Nations Cup in Kyiv, Ukraine, in 2019. His team finished second.

As of 2021 he is a full-time columnist for Online-Casinos.com and BestBettingSites.com.

References

1969 births
English male journalists
English poker players
British gambling writers
Living people
Poker commentators